Maireana planifolia, the low bluebush (a name it shares with Maireana astrotricha), is a species of flowering plant in the family Amaranthaceae, native to western and central Australia. It is found in a wide variety of situations, including sandy areas, rocky slopes, and in the mulga habitat.

References

planifolia
Endemic flora of Australia
Flora of Western Australia
Flora of the Northern Territory
Flora of South Australia
Taxa named by Ferdinand von Mueller
Plants described in 1975